The British Universities cricket team played in First-class cricket matches between 1996 and 2006 and List A cricket matches between 1996 and 1998. This is a list of the players who appeared in those matches.

A
 Jimmy Adams (2002–2004): JHK Adams
 Adnan Akram (2005): Adnan Akram
 Omar Anwar (2004): OS Anwar

B

C

D

E

F

G
 Chinmay Gupte (1996): CM Gupte

H

I
 Imraan Mohammad (1999): Imraan Mohammad

J
 Will Jefferson (2000–2002): WI Jefferson
 Steffan Jones (1997): PS Jones

K
 Gul Khan (1996): GA Khan
 Josh Knappett (2005–2006): JPT Knappett

L

M

N
 Chris Nash (2004): CD Nash

P

R

S

T
 Delroy Taylor (2003): DB Taylor
 James Tomlinson (2002–2003): JA Tomlinson
 Mark Tournier (2000–2002): MA Tournier

W

References

Combined Universities